Beatrice Jeanie Whitby (1855, Ottery Saint Mary, Devon, UK – 20 January 1931) was an English author of novels and short stories.

Biography
Beatrice Whitby's father was a physician, Dr. Charles Whitby. She was the middle daughter of Dr. Whitby's three daughters and had five brothers. Around 1880 the family moved to Leamington Spa in Warwickshire. The oldest son in the family was killed, after an illustrious military career, in the Second Anglo–Afghan War. Another of Dr. Whitby's sons, Hugh Whitby, was a famous cricketer. On 18 November 1894 she married a physician, Dr. Philip Hicks (1867–1922). For many years the couple lived at 11 Clarendon Square in Leamington Spa. They had a daughter, Beatrice Mary (born in 1899), and a son, Philip Hugh Whitby, nicknamed "Pip", who became a famous Brigadier in WW II.

From 1889 to 1911 Beatrice Whitby published about a dozen novels.

Her husband died at age 55. Upon her death, her body was interred at his side in Milverton Cemetery.

Selected publications

References

1855 births
1931 deaths
English women novelists
19th-century English women writers
19th-century English novelists
20th-century English women writers
20th-century English novelists
People from Ottery St Mary